Norman S. Johnson (d.1989) was a dentist and an Australian and international Scouting official.

Background
Johnson was a student (1931-43) and Scout and, subsequently, a Scoutmaster of Trinity Grammar School at Kew in Melbourne, Victoria, Australia. He also became an official of The Boy Scouts Association Victorian Branch, serving as a leader trainer, commissioner and, from 1976-79, as its Victorian Chief Commissioner. He became the chairman of The Scout Association of Australia's national executive committee. He served as a member then chairman of the World Organization of the Scout Movement's World Scout Committee.

In 1990, Johnson was posthumously awarded the 212th Bronze Wolf, the only distinction of the World Organization of the Scout Movement, awarded by its World Scout Committee for exceptional services to world Scouting.

In 1945 Johnson authored Camping for scouts and others which ran to three further editions.

References

External links

Recipients of the Bronze Wolf Award
Year of birth missing
People educated at Trinity Grammar School, Kew
Scouting and Guiding in Australia